A by-election was held for the New South Wales Legislative Assembly electorate of Ashfield on 28 June 1952 because of the resignation of Athol Richardson who had accepted an appointment as a Judge of the Supreme Court.

Dates

Result

The retiring member Athol Richardson (Liberal) had been appointed as a Judge of the Supreme Court, and Athol Richardson (Liberal) was not related to Jack Richardson (Labor) who capitalised on their surnames, campaigning on the slogan “Judge Richardson on his merits”.

See also
Electoral results for the district of Ashfield
List of New South Wales state by-elections

References

1952 elections in Australia
New South Wales state by-elections
1950s in New South Wales